George Hair (28 April 1925 – 1994) was an English professional footballer who played as a winger.

References

1925 births
1994 deaths
People from Ryton, Tyne and Wear
Footballers from Tyne and Wear
English footballers
Association football wingers
Newcastle United F.C. players
Grimsby Town F.C. players
Peterborough United F.C. players
Boston United F.C. players
Spalding United F.C. players
English Football League players